Magasa is a Neolithic settlement on the eastern part of the island of Crete in present-day Greece. Magasa is notable as a Neolithic Cretan settlement for some use of large room sizes in its multi-roomed residences.  The ben-and-but style of housing design with some use of mud-dried brick has been noted as similar to that found in Neolithic Knossos.

See also
Lato
Kydonia

References

Sources
 British School at Athens, British School at Athens Managing Committee (1894) The Annual of the British School at Athens, Macmillan Publishers
 C. Michael Hogan, Knossos fieldnotes, Modern Antiquarian (2007)
 Arnold Walter Lawrence and Richard Allan Tomlinson (1996) Greek Architecture, Yale University Press, 243 pages  

Neolithic settlements in Crete
Former populated places in Greece